Traw may refer to:
London Lewis Traw, United States Marine Corps sergeant killed in action during World War II
USS Traw (DE-350), United States Navy destroyer escort named for Traw
traW, one kind of protein encoded by transfer genes
Dialect of the Cua language (Mon-Khmer)